Troy Dye (born September 18, 1996) is an American football middle linebacker for the Minnesota Vikings of the National Football League (NFL). He played college football at Oregon.

Early years
Dye attended Norco High School in Norco, California. He played safety in high school. As a senior he had 105 tackles and four interceptions. He committed to the University of Oregon to play college football.

College career
Dye was a four-year starter at Oregon. As a freshman in 2016 he started nine of 11 games, finishing with a team-high 92 tackles, 6.5 sacks and one interception. As a sophomore in 2017, he started all 13 games and again led the team in tackles with 107 and had four sacks and one interception. He led the team in tackles for a third straight year his junior year in 2018 with 115 and added two sacks and an interception over 13 starts. Dye returned for his senior year in 2019, rather than enter the 2019 NFL Draft.

Professional career

Dye was drafted by the Minnesota Vikings in the fourth round (132nd overall) of the 2020 NFL Draft. He was placed on injured reserve on September 24, 2020. He was activated on October 31, 2020.

Personal life
His brother, Travis Dye, plays running back at USC. His brother, Tony Dye, played free safety for the Cincinnati Bengals, for coach Mike Zimmer, Troy's former coach in Minnesota.

References

External links
Oregon Ducks bio

1996 births
Living people
People from Norco, California
Players of American football from California
Sportspeople from Riverside County, California
American football linebackers
Oregon Ducks football players
Minnesota Vikings players